Alexandro Álvarez Olivares (born January 26, 1977 in Mexico City) is a retired Mexican professional footballer.

Honours
Necaxa
FIFA Club World Cup: Third Place - 2000

Morelia
Supercopa MX (1): 2014

References

External links

1977 births
Living people
Association football goalkeepers
Mexican footballers
Mexico under-20 international footballers
Club Necaxa footballers
Club Celaya footballers
Santos Laguna footballers
C.D. Veracruz footballers
Coronel Bolognesi footballers
Club Puebla players
Atlético Morelia players
Atlético San Luis footballers
Mexican expatriate footballers
Expatriate footballers in Peru
Liga MX players